NGC 636 is an elliptical galaxy in the Cetus constellation. It is located about 96 million light-years from the Milky Way. It was discovered by the German–British astronomer William Herschel in 1785.

See also 
 List of NGC objects (1–1000)

References

External links 
 

Elliptical galaxies
0636
Cetus (constellation)
006110